Tuathflaith, Gaelic-Irish female given name. Alternate spellings include, 'Tuathlaith' and 'Tuathla'. As the name derives from the male given name 'Tuathal' meaning 'ruler of the people' Tuathflaith is understood to mean 'princess of the people'.

Bearers of the name

 Tuathflaith ingen Cathail, Queen of Leinster, died 749.

External links
 http://medievalscotland.org/kmo/AnnalsIndex/Feminine/Uasal.shtml

Irish-language feminine given names